Timothy Clark Choate (October 11, 1954 – September 24, 2004) was an American actor who starred in a number of film and television roles on series such as Dragnet and Babylon 5.

Choate was born and raised in Dallas, Texas, the son of Betty Nell (née Strong), a commercial artist, and Ben Tom Choate, who worked in building and construction. He appeared in theater productions while attending the University of Texas in Austin and also attended Cornell University.

He was active on stage in both New York and Hollywood. On Broadway, he appeared in Crimes of the Heart and Da. He also performed at the Los Angeles Shakespeare Fest in Twelfth Night and The Merry Wives of Windsor as well as in the Los Angeles production of Beyond Therapy. Choate appeared in regional productions at the Long Wharf Theater, the Kennedy Center and the Berkshire Theatre Festival.

His film appearances included several Merchant Ivory productions including The Europeans (1979), Jane Austen in Manhattan (1980), and Jefferson in Paris (1995); Times Square (1980), Ghost Story (1981), Blow Out (1981), Def-Con 4 (1985), the Oscar-winning short Ray's Male Heterosexual Dance Hall (1987), Soapdish (1991), Immaculate Conception (1992), Live Nude Girls (1995), and Pearl Harbor (2001).

On television, he played Zathras on Babylon 5 and had a recurring role on Newhart, as well as appearing in several TV movies, notably Blind Witness (1989), Highway to Heaven (1989) and Child in the Night (1990), and guesting on shows including The Practice, Diagnosis: Murder, and The Bold and the Beautiful. He played Michael Killup in the Tales from the Darkside episode "Halloween Candy" (1985).

He was killed in a motorcycle accident in Los Angeles, California in 2004, aged 49. He is interred at Forest Lawn Memorial Park in Glendale, California.

Filmography

References

External links

1954 births
2004 deaths
Male actors from Dallas
American male film actors
American male stage actors
American male television actors
Cornell University alumni
Motorcycle road incident deaths
Road incident deaths in California
Burials at Forest Lawn Memorial Park (Glendale)
20th-century American male actors